Tracy-Ann Rowe (born 17 September 1985 in Manchester, Jamaica) is a female track and field sprinter from Jamaica, who competes in the 100 metres and 200 metres.



Career

Her personal best time in the women's 100 m is 11.25, set on 6 June 2007 in Sacramento, California. She won a gold medal in the women's 4x100 metres relay at the 2007 Pan American Games, alongside Sheri-Ann Brooks, Peta-Gaye Gayle, and Aleen Bailey.

Achievements

References

1985 births
Living people
People from Manchester Parish
Jamaican female sprinters
Athletes (track and field) at the 2007 Pan American Games
Pan American Games gold medalists for Jamaica
Pan American Games medalists in athletics (track and field)
Medalists at the 2007 Pan American Games
21st-century Jamaican women